Ogunnaike is Yoruba surname. Notable people with the surname include:

 Babatunde Ogunnaike, American chemical engineer of Nigerian descent
 Lola Ogunnaike, American entertainment journalist